The 1898–99 FA Cup was the 28th season of the world's oldest association football competition, the Football Association Challenge Cup (more usually known as the FA Cup). The cup was won by Sheffield United, who defeated Derby County 4–1 in the final of the competition, played at Crystal Palace in London.

Matches were scheduled to be played at the stadium of the team named first on the date specified for each round, which was always a Saturday. If scores were level after 90 minutes had been played, a replay would take place at the stadium of the second-named team later the same week. If the replayed match was drawn further replays would be held at neutral venues until a winner was determined. If scores were level after 90 minutes had been played in a replay, a 30-minute period of extra time would be played.

Calendar
The format of the FA Cup for the season had a preliminary round, five qualifying rounds, three proper rounds, and the semi finals and final.

First round proper
The first round proper contained sixteen ties between 32 teams. The 18 First Division sides were given a bye to this round, as were Newton Heath, Woolwich Arsenal and Manchester City from the Second Division, and non-league Southampton. Most of the other Second Division sides were entered into the third qualifying round, with the exceptions of Barnsley, who started in the second qualifying round, and Burton Swifts, Blackpool and Loughborough who were placed in the first qualifying round. Of those sides, only Grimsby Town, Small Heath and Glossop North End qualified to the FA Cup proper. Seven non-league sides also qualified.

The matches were played on Saturday, 28 January 1899. Four matches were drawn, with the replays taking place in the following midweek fixture.

Second round proper
The eight Second Round matches were scheduled for Saturday, 11 February 1899, although only three games were played on this date. The other five games were played the following Saturday. There were three replays, played in the following midweek fixture.

Third round proper
The four Third Round matches were scheduled for Saturday, 25 February 1899. There were no replays.

Semi-finals

The semi-final matches were both played on Saturday, 18 March 1899. The Sheffield United–Liverpool match went to a replay, played the following Thursday. The match was again replayed a week later, when Sheffield managed a 1–0 win. They went on to meet Derby County in the final at Crystal Palace.

Replay

Second Replay

Final

The final took place on Saturday, 15 April 1899 at Crystal Palace.  Just under 74,000 supporters attended the match, a record attendance at the time. John Boag opened the scoring for Derby County after 12 minutes. Derby's lead was maintained until midway through the second half, until Sheffield struck back with three goals in ten minutes from Walter Bennett, Billy Beer and John Almond. Fred Priest scored the fourth and final goal in the eighty-ninth minute, to cap a good victory for the Yorkshire side.

Match details

See also
FA Cup Final Results 1872-

References
General
Official site; fixtures and results service at TheFA.com
1898-1899 FA Cup at rsssf.com
1898-1899 FA Cup at soccerbase.com

Specific

1898-99
1898–99 in English football
FA